Pyambuugiin Tuul (born February 17, 1959) is a retired long-distance runner from Mongolia, who represented his native country in the men's marathon at the 1992 Summer Olympics in Barcelona, Spain. He was blind in one eye for thirteen years before taking up the marathon.

See also
 Luvsanlkhündegiin Otgonbayar, Mongolian competitor who finished last in the Olympic marathon in 2004
 Abdul Baser Wasiqi, Afghan Olympic marathoner in 1996, who finished last and comprised his country's entire Olympic team

References

External links
 
sports-reference

1959 births
Living people
Mongolian male long-distance runners
Mongolian male marathon runners
Olympic athletes of Mongolia
Athletes (track and field) at the 1992 Summer Olympics
Sportspeople with a vision impairment
20th-century Mongolian people